James Horatio Thorpe (16 September 1913 – 9 February 1936) was an English footballer born in Jarrow.

He played 139 games as a goalkeeper for his only club, Sunderland. He signed when he was 17 after attending Jarrow Central School. He had a promising career, becoming starter for the club from 1932-33 season, when he was still only 19 years old.

His life and career were cut short on 1 February 1936 when he was kicked in the head and chest after he had picked up the ball following a backpass in a game against Chelsea at Roker Park. He continued to take part until the match finished, but collapsed at home afterwards and died in hospital four days later from diabetes mellitus and heart failure 'accelerated by the rough usage of the opposing team' 

This tragic end to Thorpe's career led to a change in the rules, where players were no longer allowed to raise their foot to a goalkeeper when he had control of the ball in his arms. Though Thorpe may be little known, even in the North East, goalkeepers around the world doubtlessly owe a debt to him. The changed rules now says that players cannot kick the ball out of the goalkeeper's hands. Sunderland went on to win the Championship that same year, and his medal was presented to his widow. During the 75th Anniversary of the game between Sunderland and Chelsea both goalkeepers wore black armbands as a mark of respects for Jimmy's efforts.

He was survived by his wife May and three-year-old son Ronnie. Some 70 years after Jimmy Thorpe's death, his son contributed towards a book penned by local historian John Kelters, 1 Jimmy Thorpe. May Thorpe remarried in 1940 to John Linklater Battye. Widowed again on the death of her second husband in 1976, she later moved to Lancashire, and died at Ulverston in the county in 1991, at the age of 77.

Honours
 First Division: 1935–36

References

External links
Full details of Sunderland career

1913 births
1936 deaths
English footballers
Association football goalkeepers
Sunderland A.F.C. players
Association football players who died while playing
Place of birth missing
Sport deaths in England
Sportspeople from Jarrow
English Football League players
Footballers from Tyne and Wear